Mathghamhain mac Cian was an Eóganacht Raithlind nobleman and maternal grandson of Brian Boru. He was the son of Cian mac Máelmuaid and his wife Sadhbh, who was a daughter of the High King Brian Boru. He died at the Battle of Clontarf in 1014 fighting for the High King.

Mathghamhain's descendants eventually became sovereigns over territory in west Cork, notably around the Iveragh Peninsula and the town of Bandon. Today, his descendants use the surname O'Mahony, O'Mahoney, Mahoney, Mahony, Maughon or Mahaney

References 

1014 deaths
Military personnel killed in action
Year of birth unknown